Lake Stevens High School is a high school located in Lake Stevens, Washington, United States, in the Lake Stevens School District. LSHS currently educates grades 10–12.

History
LSHS first opened in the early 20th century where North Lake Middle School is currently located.  LSHS has since moved to its current location on 113th Avenue, and the current school was remodeled in the 1990s and again in the summer of 2007, and is currently undergoing a modernization 2018–2021. In the summer of 2010, the football stadium was torn down and remodeled to accommodate more people.

Pink Palace
From 1929 to 1979, Lake Stevens High School was located on the grounds where North Lake Middle School currently stands. Painted with surplus paint with a pinkish hue sometime between 1958 -1959, the school was eventually nicknamed the Pink Palace. After the 1978–1979 school year, the building was demolished, and students began at the current LSHS location in the fall of 1979.

School activities

Several school programs use names that reference the region's Scandinavian heritage, which is also reflected in the "Vikings" mascot. The annual yearbook is known as The Rune, while the student newspaper is The Valhalla.

Lake Stevens High School has four bands which all play at both the fall and spring concerts and at a large number of festivals and ensembles. These bands are the two jazz bands, the wind ensemble, and the concert band. All the bands come together to make the Viking Pep Band, which plays at all home football and basketball games and participates in school assemblies. The bands have won many awards from festivals such as MPMEA, Pasco, and BDX.

Sports, athletics and clubs
LSHS is a member of the 4A WESCO North division of Washington State.

Wrestling
The varsity wrestling team has won 11 state titles: 1990, 2000, 2001, 2004, 2007, 2008, 2009, 2011, 2012, 2013, 2016 under coach Brent Barnes,  and assistant coaches Andy Knutson, Dean Width, Tyrsten Perales, and Matt Leonard. The team went 18 years without losing a WESCO league match, last losing to Lynnwood High School during the 1993 season. In the 2007–2008 season, the streak ended with a loss to Snohomish High School by a margin of 18–31. However, the team went on to win the state championship that same year. MTV featured the Lake Stevens High School wrestling team in an episode of True Life in 2012, the episode entitled, "On The Mat". The girls' wrestling team is led by head coach Al Soler and assistant coach Jen Soler.

Girls' basketball
Girls' basketball team played in the 2008 state tournament. The girls' basketball team is led by head coach Randy Edens, Junior Varsity coach Marcus Merrifield, and assistant coaches Gil Mckinnie and Steve Berg.

Football
The Lake Stevens High School football team is currently led by football head coach Tom Tri, with assistance from coaches Eric Dinwiddie, Kirby Kinchen, Geoff Dishon, Matt Leonard, Eric Solbakken, Mitch Roehl, Kyle Dressen, Tre Long, and Noah Pester. He has led the Lake Stevens Vikings to numerous undefeated, playoff seasons ever since his takeover in 2004. In 2018 the Vikings took 2nd WIAA 4A, losing the Championship game to Union High School.  As of 2022, they are the 10-peat champions of the Wesco 4A Conference. Lake Stevens won their first state championship in football in 2022 defeating Kennedy Catholic 24-22

Boys' soccer
The boys' soccer team has been nationally ranked by the Adidas National Soccer Association of America. In the 2006 season, their peak ranking was #9 in the national poll and #2 in their region, they finished fourth in state that year. In 2010, the boys' soccer team completed its most successful season to date, winning Wesco North and All Wesco district titles and eventually making it into the state finals. In the same year, the boys' soccer team was also ranked #21 out of 50 on ESPN's FAB 50, which ranks the top 50 teams in the nation. The boys' soccer team is led by head coach Wes VanHooser, Junior Varsity coach Andy Knutson, freshmen coach Leslie Poirier, and assistant coaches Scott Flanders and Ramon Maldonado.

Cross country
The Lake Stevens High School cross country team, led by Stuart Chaffee and Josh Fountain, with assistance from Cliff Chaffee, Drew Larson, Lawrence Roe, and Jen Roe, has sent runners to the state meet for several years in a row. Their most recent season (2017) ended by sending the girls varsity team on to the state championship meet for the first time in many years.

Boys' tennis
The boys' tennis team is led by head coach Mark Hein, and Junior Varsity coach Steve Pitkin.

Girls' soccer
The girls' soccer team is led by head coach Prato Barone, Junior Varsity coach Leslie Poirier, and assistant coach Ramon Maldonado.

Girls' swimming
The girls' swim team is led by head coach Sarah Summers, assistant coach Brady Dykgraaf, and dive coach Rachel McCoy.

Girls' volleyball
The girls' volleyball team is led by head coach Kyle Hoglund, and assistant coaches Lori Barlow, Greg VanWhye, and Kylee Hilde.

Boys' basketball
The boys' basketball team is led by head coach Alex Iverson, Junior Varsity coach Jacob Strong, and assistant coach Dante Lewis.

Boys' swimming & diving
The boys' swimming & diving team is led by head coach Brady Dykgraaf, assistant coaches Josh Fountain, Cliff Chaffee, and dive coach Rachel McCoy.

Baseball
The baseball team is led by head coach Josh White, and assistant coach Jacob Strong.

Boys' golf
The boys' golf team is led by head coach Cliff McKinlay.

Girls' golf
The girls' golf team is led by head coach Jodi Widmann, and assistant coach Larry Palmer.

Girls' tennis
The girls' tennis team is led by head coach Jeff Leer, Junior Varsity coach Lori Barlow, assistant coach Al Medina, and C-team coach Steve Pitkin.

Softball
The softball team is led by head coach Sarah Hirsch, and Junior Varsity coach Marcus Merrifield.

Track and field
The track and field team is led by head coach Jeff Page.
2022 4A State Champions.

Performing arts

Theatre
Lake Stevens High School offers an Introduction to Theatre and an Advanced Theatre course.

Choir
Lake Stevens High School offers Concert Choir, Jazz Choir, and Treble Choir. Choir is directed by Mrs. Monika Tabor at both LSHS and Cavelero Mid High School.

Notable alumni

Mitch Canham - Former Oregon State catcher and current minor league baseball player for the Oakland Athletics.
Marv Harshman - Member of the National Basketball Hall of Fame
 Cory Kennedy - Pro-skateboarder
Kathryn Holloway, American  Paralympic volleyballist
Chris Pratt - Television and Film actor. Television shows such as Everwood, The O.C., and Parks and Recreation. Films such as The Lego Movie and Guardians of the Galaxy (film). (Spoke for the class of 2020's graduation
Stephen Thompson - Played on Super Bowl III (New York Jets), currently a pastor in Marysville, Washington.
Ryan Verdugo - Major League Baseball pitcher (Kansas City Royals, Boston Red Sox)
Jacob Eason - NFL quarterback for the Seattle Seahawks

References

External links
Lake Stevens High School Website
HeraldNet Prep Sports
Lake Stevens School District #4
Woodinville Band
The Valhalla
Lake Stevens High School Twitter page
Lake Stevens High School Athletics Twitter page
Lake Stevens High School Football Twitter page
Lake Stevens High School Sophomore class Twitter page
Lake Stevens High School Esports Twitter page
Lake Stevens High School Counseling Center Twitter page
Lake Stevens High School Track and Field Twitter page
Lake Stevens High School Drama club Twitter page
Lake Stevens High School Instagram page
Lake Stevens High School Student Section Instagram page
Lake Stevens High School Senior class Instagram page
Lake Stevens High School Asian Student Union club Instagram page
Lake Stevens High School DECA Instagram page
Lake Stevens High School LINK club Instagram page
Lake Stevens High School Best Buddies Instagram page
Lake Stevens High School Boys' Soccer Instagram page
Lake Stevens High School Esports Instagram page
Lake Stevens High School Girls' Wrestling Instagram page
Lake Stevens High School Interact club Instagram page
Lake Stevens High School Dance club Instagram page
Lake Stevens High School Drama club Instagram page
Lake Stevens High School Baseball Instagram page
Lake Stevens High School Boys' Wrestling Instagram page
Lake Stevens High School Cross Country Instagram page
Lake Stevens High School Volleyball Instagram page
Lake Stevens High School Boys' Tennis Instagram page
Lake Stevens High School Sophomore class Instagram page
Lake Stevens High School Junior class Instagram page
Lake Stevens High School "The Cove" Instagram page
Lake Stevens High School National Honor Society club Instagram page
Lake Stevens High School Football Instagram page
Lake Stevens High School FCCLA club Instagram page
Lake Stevens High School Cheer club Instagram page
Lake Stevens High School Band Instagram page
Lake Stevens High School Counseling Center Instagram page
Lake Stevens High School Athletics YouTube page #1
Lake Stevens High School Athletics YouTube page #2
Lake Stevens High School Athletics YouTube page #3
Lake Stevens High School Esports YouTube page
Lake Stevens High School Esports Twitch page
Lake Stevens High School TikTok page

1909 establishments in Washington (state)
Educational institutions established in 1909
High schools in Snohomish County, Washington
Public high schools in Washington (state)